Schizothorax zarudnyi is a species of cyprinid freshwater fish from Iran and Afghanistan, where restricted to lakes in the Sistan Basin.

Etymology
The fish is named in honor of Nikolai Zarudny (1859-1919), a Ukrainian-Russian explorer and ornithologist, who collected the holotype specimens.

References 

Schizothorax
Fish described in 1897
Taxa named by Alexander Nikolsky